North Ridge United Methodist Church is a historic United Methodist church located at North Ridge, New York in Niagara County, New York.  It is a Greek Revival style cobblestone church constructed in 1848.  It features mostly round, evenly colored, lake washed cobbles.  It is one of approximately 47 cobblestone buildings in Niagara County.

It was listed on the National Register of Historic Places in 2002.

Gallery

References

Churches on the National Register of Historic Places in New York (state)
Churches completed in 1848
19th-century Methodist church buildings in the United States
Cobblestone architecture
United Methodist churches in New York (state)
Churches in Niagara County, New York
National Register of Historic Places in Niagara County, New York